Thomas McIntyre Nairn (June 16, 1830 – June 1, 1888) was an Ontario businessman and political figure. He represented Elgin East in the Legislative Assembly of Ontario from 1879 to 1883 and from 1886 to 1888 as a Liberal member.

He was born in Bonhill, Dumbartonshire, Scotland in 1830, the son of James Nairn, and was educated there. In 1850, he came to Saint John, New Brunswick, moving to Aylmer, Canada West one year later. Nairn worked as a bookkeeper there, later becoming a general merchant and grain dealer and then a notary public. He married Delphine Van Patter in 1854. Nairn served 21 years on the council for Malahide Township and eight years on the council for Elgin County; he was county warden from 1866 to 1871. He served as a director on the board for the Canada Southern and Canada Air Line Railways. Nairn ran unsuccessfully in East Elgin in 1867 but then was elected in 1879. He was defeated by Charles Oaks Ermatinger in the 1883 general election but was elected again in 1886.

He died in office in 1888.

External links 
The Canadian parliamentary companion and annual register, 1880, CH Mackintosh
Member's parliamentary history for the Legislative Assembly of Ontario
Historical Sketches of the County of Elgin
The Scot in British North America. Vol III, WJ Ratray (1880)
“ A race to the border that started 150 years ago— by North Shore Beacon | Jan 11, 2021 | History, Michael Baker“ 

1830 births
1888 deaths
Ontario Liberal Party MPPs
Scottish emigrants to pre-Confederation Ontario
Immigrants to the Province of Canada
Scottish emigrants to pre-Confederation New Brunswick
People from Bonhill